Louis H Schwitzer ( – ) was born in Bielitz, Austria-Hungary, and emigrated to America before World War I.

As an engineer, Schwitzer was influential in designing hydraulics for use in bus transportation.  He also pioneered improvements in automotive cooling fans, water pumps and oil pumps, and the turbocharger.  Schwitzer made a fortune in business and became a philanthropist. The Student Center at the University of Indianapolis bears his name, as does a women's dormitory at nearby Butler University.

As an automobile race driver, Schwitzer won the first automobile race at the Indianapolis Motor Speedway (IMS), a five-mile race on August 19, 1909. He is known to have started five races at IMS in 1909 and 1910.  He also drove relief, for Harry Cobe, in the first Indianapolis 500.  Schwitzer served on the Indianapolis Motor Speedway Technical Committee from 1912 through 1945.

In recognition of Schwitzer's contributions to the early developmental history of American motorsports, the Louis H. Schwitzer Award for Design Innovation is presented annually after each running of the Indianapolis 500-Mile Race.

In 1970, Schwitzer was inducted into the Automotive Hall of Fame.

He is buried at Crown Hill Cemetery in Indianapolis.

References

http://www.firstsuperspeedway.com/sites/default/files/Indianapolis_Speedway_William_Borque.pdf
http://www.theautochannel.com/news/2009/05/20/461933.html

External links

1880 births
1967 deaths
20th-century American engineers
Austro-Hungarian emigrants to the United States
Burials at Crown Hill Cemetery
20th-century American inventors
People from Bielsko